Arrias Battery, also known as Xemxija Battery or Pwales Left Battery, is an artillery battery in Xemxija, limits of St. Paul's Bay, Malta. It was built by the Order of Saint John in 1715–1716 as one of a series of coastal fortifications around the Maltese Islands. The battery still exists, although it has modern alterations, and it is used as a restaurant.

History
Arrias Battery was built in 1715–1716 as part of the Order of Saint John's first building program of batteries and redoubts around the coasts of Malta. It was one of two batteries defending Xemxija Bay, the other one being the now-demolished Dellia Battery.

The battery originally consisted of a mostly rectangular platform with a rounded end at the north. It had a low parapet with one embrasure, and the gorge was closed off by a rectangular blockhouse. The redoubt was named after the knight Emmanuele Arrias, and an inscription commemorating him is located above the main entrance.

The battery eventually became a summer residence of the Borg Cardona family. They called it ix-Xemxija and later, the area around it began to be referred to by that name.

Present day

The battery still exists, but several alterations have been made to the structure, mostly during the course of the 20th century. These include a second-floor added to the blockhouse and a flight of steps leading to an entrance facing the sea.

The battery is now used as a restaurant, known as The Fortress Wine & Dine. It is a Grade 1 national monument, and it is also listed on the National Inventory of the Cultural Property of the Maltese Islands.

References

Notes

External links

National Inventory of the Cultural Property of the Maltese Islands

Batteries in Malta
Hospitaller fortifications in Malta
Restaurants in Malta
Limestone buildings in Malta
National Inventory of the Cultural Property of the Maltese Islands
18th-century fortifications
1715 establishments in Malta
Military installations established in 1715
Buildings and structures in St. Paul's Bay
18th Century military history of Malta